CSSA may refer to:

Organizations
 Cactus and Succulent Society of America
 California State Student Association
 Center for Service & Social Action, furthering the Jesuit mission of educating through service and advocacy
 Chinese Students and Scholars Association, the official organization for overseas Chinese students
 Connecticut State Soccer Association
 Corporación Sudamericana de Servicios Aéreos, an airline merged into Aviación del Litoral Fluvial Argentino
Crop Science Society of America

Other uses
 Star of South Africa, Commander (post-nominal letters)
 Comprehensive Social Security Assistance, a welfare programme operated by Social Welfare Department of Hong Kong
 Camp Stanley Storage Activity, operated by Camp Stanley, US

See also
 CSSA Nations Cup, a former football championship